The 1995–96 AS Saint-Étienne season was the club's 63rd season in existence and the 10th consecutive season in the top flight of French football. In addition to the domestic league, Saint-Étienne participated in this season's editions of the Coupe de France and the Coupe de la Ligue. The season covered the period from 1 July 1995 to 30 June 1996.

Pre-season and friendlies

Competitions

Overview

French Division 1

League table

Results summary

Results by round

Matches

Source:

Coupe de France

Coupe de la Ligue

References

External links

AS Saint-Étienne seasons
Saint-Étienne